Ab Surakh may refer to:
 Ab Surakh, Fars
 Ab Surakh, Dezful, Khuzestan Province
 Ab Surakh, Izeh, Khuzestan Province